Lynda Serene Jones (born 1959) is the President and Johnston Family Professor for Religion and Democracy at Union Theological Seminary in the City of New York. She was formerly the Titus Street Professor of Theology at Yale Divinity School and chair of gender, woman, and sexuality studies at Yale University.

Biography
Born Lynda Serene Jones on July 31, 1959, she is the eldest of three daughters. Her mother, Sarah Jones, was a licensed psychotherapist. Her father, Joe Robert Jones, was a graduate of Yale Divinity School and served as Dean of the Graduate Seminary (1975–1979) and President of Phillips University from 1979 to 1988. Serene is a graduate of Enid High School in Enid, Oklahoma. Serene's younger sister Kindy Jones is Assistant Attorney General for the State of Oklahoma. Her youngest sister, Verity Jones, is a former Disciples of Christ pastor and editor of DisciplesWorld.

After graduating with a Bachelor of Arts degree from the University of Oklahoma, Jones earned a Master of Divinity degree from Yale Divinity School in 1985, and a Doctor of Philosophy degree in theology from Yale University in 1991. She is an ordained minister in both the Christian Church (Disciples of Christ) and the United Church of Christ. She taught at Yale University for seventeen years. On July 1, 2008, Jones succeeded Joseph Hough as President of Union Theological Seminary in the City of New York.

Jones is the 16th president of the historic Union Theological Seminary in the City of New York. The first woman to head the 179-year-old interdenominational seminary, she occupies the Johnston Family Chair for Religion and Democracy and has formed Union’s Institute for Women, Religion and Globalization, as well as the Institute for Art, Religion and Social Justice. Jones came to Union after seventeen years at Yale University, where she was the Titus Street Professor of Theology at the Divinity School and chair of Women, Gender and Sexuality Studies in the Graduate School of Arts and Sciences. She was the president of the American Academy of Religion for 2016.

Publications
Jones has published 37 articles and book chapters since 1991.

Her work has appeared in Time magazine.
In May 2014 she was interviewed by Georgetown University's Berkley Center for Religion, Peace and World Affairs.
She has written and co-written over 10 articles for the Huffington Post.

Works

Books

Edited

Articles and chapters

References

External links
 Profile on the Union Theological Seminary website

1959 births
Living people
University of Oklahoma alumni
Yale Divinity School alumni
Yale University faculty
Union Theological Seminary (New York City) faculty
Christian Church (Disciples of Christ) clergy
American Disciples of Christ
United Church of Christ members
Seminary presidents
Presidents of Phillips University
Writers from Enid, Oklahoma
Enid High School alumni